Michael John Sabia  (born September 11, 1953) is a Canadian businessman and civil servant. From 2009 until January 2020, Sabia was president and CEO of Caisse de dépôt et placement du Québec. He previously served as CEO of BCE Inc. from 2002 to 2008. In November 2019, the University of Toronto's Munk School of Global Affairs and Public Policy announced that Sabia would be its new director. He served in that role from February to December 2020, when he was appointed by the Government of Canada as Deputy Minister of Finance.

Personal life
Born in St. Catharines, Ontario, Sabia is the son of Michael Joseph Sabia and Laura Sabia (née Villela); both of his parents are of Italian descent. He attended Ridley College in St. Catharines. Sabia received his undergraduate education from the University of Toronto, and he earned his graduate degree at Yale University.

His wife, Hilary Pearson, is the granddaughter of former Prime Minister Lester B. Pearson. In 2016, Sabia was appointed as an Officer of the Order of Canada.

Career
Sabia held a number of senior positions in Canada's federal public service during the 1980s and early 1990s, including Deputy Secretary to the Cabinet of the Privy Council Office. Sabia's supervisor at that time, Clerk of the Privy Council Paul Tellier, left the public service in the early 1990s to assume the presidency of a Crown corporation, Canadian National Railway. He subsequently persuaded Sabia to follow him to help in privatizing the company. Sabia held a number of executive positions at Canadian National Railway during the 1990s, including the position of chief financial officer.

He left Canadian National Railway to join Bell Canada Enterprises in 1999 and became chief executive in 2002, succeeding Jean Monty. In 2007, the BCE board of directors accepted an offer from the Ontario Teachers' Pension Plan to privatize the telecommunications company.  Later that year, Sabia said he would leave Bell after the privatization deal was finalized.  Sabia left Bell in July 2008 and was succeeded by George Cope.  By December 2008, following the collapse of the debt market, the privatization deal fell apart.

On March 13, 2009, Sabia was named chief executive of Caisse de dépôt et placement du Québec (CDPQ), succeeding Fernand Perrault. At CDPQ, he was both president and CEO. On February 15, 2017, CDPQ announced that Sabia's mandate as president and CEO was renewed until March 31, 2021. Bloomberg said in 2019 that "under Sabia's tenure, the Caisse dove into international markets. About 64% of the fund, which manages the pension savings for the province of Quebec, is now in global markets versus 36% in 2009."

Sabia was a member of the Canadian federal government's Advisory Council on Economic Growth, which advised the Canadian finance minister on economic policies to achieve long-term sustainable growth. In 2016, the council called for a gradual increase in permanent immigration to Canada to 450,000 people a year.

On November 12, 2019, it was announced that Sabia would be leaving CDPQ to become head of the Munk School of Global Affairs and Public Policy at the University of Toronto, ending his term at CDPQ a year early. He started the new role in February 2020. Sabia was replaced as head of CDPQ by Charles Emond in January 2020.

In April 2020, Sabia was appointed as Chairperson of the Canada Infrastructure Bank. In June 2020, he was named to the board of directors of the Mastercard Foundation.

On December 6, 2020, it was announced that Sabia would replace Paul Rochon as Deputy Minister of the federal Department of Finance. On January 27, 2021, Tamara Vrooman was appointed to succeed Sabia as Chairperson of the Canada Infrastructure Bank.

See also
 Réseau express métropolitain

References

External links
 Michael Sabia, Deputy Minister – Department of Finance

1953 births
Businesspeople from St. Catharines
Canadian chief executives
Canadian people of Italian descent
Living people
Officers of the Order of Canada
People of Bell Canada
Ridley College alumni
University of Toronto alumni
Yale University alumni
Chief financial officers
20th-century Canadian civil servants
Directors of Canada Infrastructure Bank